Battus laodamas, the green-patch swallowtail or yellow-spotted swallowtail, is a species of butterfly in the family Papilionidae.

Description
It is a black or dark brown butterfly with green reflections. The dorsal side of the hindwings shows a broad cream or pale green band and a series of cream or pale green spots. The underside of the wings is lighter brown, with a submarginal line of whitish spots on the forewings and a submarginal line of red markings on the hindwings. The forewings have a rounded apex and the outer edge of the hindwings is scalloped. The host plant of its caterpillars is Aristolochia tentaculata.

Distribution
This species is native to the Neotropical realm. It is present in Mexico, Guatemala, Honduras, Costa Rica, Panama, Colombia and Venezuela.

Subspecies
 Battus laodamas laodamas (C. Felder & R. Felder, 1859)  Möhn, 1999, Butterflies of the World 5: 7, plate 10, figures 7-8, plate 19, figures 5-6. Smart, 1976 The Illustrated Encyclopedia of the Butterfly World page 158 fig. 14 . Colombia - S.W. Venezuela
 Battus laodamas copanae (Reakirt, 1863) Möhn, 1999, Butterflies of the World 5: 7, plate 10, figures 3-4. S. Mexico, Guatemala, Honduras
 Battus laodamas iopas (Godman & Salvin, 1897) Möhn, 1999, Butterflies of the World 5: 7, plate 10, figures 1-2 N. Mexico
 Battus laodamas rhipidius (Rothschild & Jordan, 1906) Möhn, 1999, Butterflies of the World 5: 7, plate 10, figures 5-6. Costa Rica, Panama

Gallery

References

Further reading

External links
 
Butterfly corner Images from Naturhistorisches Museum Wien

laodamas
Butterflies of Central America
Papilionidae of South America
Butterflies of North America
Lepidoptera of Colombia
Lepidoptera of Venezuela
Butterflies described in 1859